Mirza Ghalib is an Indian Historical drama television drama series written and produced by poet Gulzar. The series was aired on Doordarshan National in 1988. Naseeruddin Shah played the role of Mirza Ghalib, the famous classical Urdu and Persian poet from Mughal Empire during British colonial rule. The series featured ghazals sung and composed by Jagjit Singh and Chitra Singh.

Cast 
 Naseeruddin Shah as Mirza Ghalib
 Tanvi Azmi as Umrao Begum
 Neena Gupta - Nawab Jaan
 Shafi Inamdar as Sheikh Mohammad Ibrahim Zauq
 Sudhir Dalvi as Bahadur Shah Zafar
 Parikshit Sahni as Nawab Shams-ud-Din
 Javed Khan Amrohi as Fakir
 Mac Mohan as Nawab Jaan's servant

Music 
It included music and narration. The songs were sung by Jagjit Singh and Chitra Singh and narration by Gulzar.

List of Ghazals included in the TV Series

 Dil hi to hai
 Koi din gar zindagaani aur hai
 Hazaaron khawahishein aisi
 Har aik baat pe kehte ho tum
Bazeecha-e-atfal hai duniya mere aage
 Aah ko chahiye ek umr
 Hain aur bhi dunya mein
 Ishq mujh ko nahin
 Yeh na thi hamari qismat
 Kisi ko de ke dil koi

References

External links
 
Music of the TV Series on Apple Music

DD National original programming
Indian period television series
1988 Indian television series debuts
Indian historical television series
1980s Indian television series
Ghalib
Mughal Empire in fiction
Gulzar
Television shows set in the British Raj
Television series set in the 19th century
Television series about Islam
Cultural depictions of Indian monarchs